Undredal is a small village in Aurland Municipality in Vestland county, Norway. The popular tourist destination of Undredal is located along the Aurlandsfjorden which is a branch off the massive Sognefjorden in Norway's "fjord-country." Undredal is home to the smallest stave church in Northern Europe, Undredal Stave Church.

With a population of approximately 100 people and 500 goats, Undredal is famous for the brown goat cheese (geitost) that is still produced the traditional way.  The production of cheese is important to the local economy as eight farms produce  of cheese each year. Goat sausage is also produced locally.

Prior to 1988, Undredal was only accessible by boat, but since then a road connection has been made by constructing two lengthy tunnels as part of the European route E16 highway. The Gudvanga Tunnel leads southwest to the village of Gudvangen and the Flenja Tunnel goes to the villages of Flåm and Aurlandsvangen to the northeast.

This little village was mentioned in Rick Steves' show about Norway.

History
Historically, Undredal was first mentioned when the Bishop of Bjørgvin (Bergen) placed Pål Bårdson, a known scholar, there as a representative of the church.  Pål Bårdson was the Chancellor to the court of King Magnus, and he later was the Archbishop of Nidaros (Trondheim) from 1333 until 1346.  The Undredal Stave Church can be dated back to 1147.

Media gallery

References

External links

Undredal's web site

Villages in Vestland
Aurland